Kalokwera "Kal" Okot (born 8 October 1990) is an English professional footballer who plays as a midfielder.

Career

Professional career
Okot signed his first professional contract at the age of 28, joining USL Championship side Oklahoma City Energy on 4 February 2019.

Managerial career
Okot started gaining coaching experience as an assistant from local high schools like Chickasha while he was attending USAO and Mustang after he graduated college. He also was a coach for local Energy FC academy teams. His first high school head coach position came at Bishop McGuinness where he won the 2022 5a state championship.

References

1990 births
Living people
Association football midfielders
English footballers
English expatriate footballers
English expatriate sportspeople in the United States
Expatriate soccer players in the United States
FC London players
OKC Energy FC players
National Premier Soccer League players
USL Championship players